Alpamayo (possibly from Quechua allpa earth, mayu river, "earth river") or Shuyturaju (possibly from Ancash Quechua huytu, shuytu oblong, slim and long, Quechua rahu snow, ice, mountain covered in snow) is one of the most conspicuous peaks in the Cordillera Blanca of the Peruvian Andes. Alpamayo Creek originates northwest of it.

The Alpamayo lies next to the slightly higher Quitaraju.

In July 1966, the German magazine "Alpinismus", published a photo of Alpamayo taken by American photographer Leigh Ortenburger accompanied by an article on a survey among mountaineering experts, who chose Alpamayo as "The Most Beautiful Mountain in the World".

Climbing history and routes 

Most popular routes start from the village of Caraz, on the north of the Cordillera Blanca. A French-Belgian expedition including George and Claude Kogan claimed to have made the first ascent in 1951. After studying the photos in George Kogan's book The Ascent of Alpamayo, the German team  of G. Hauser, F. Knauss, B. Huhn & H. Wiedmann came to the conclusion that the 1951 team did not reach the actual summit, thereby making their ascent via the north ridge in 1957 the first.

The most common climbing route, known as the Ferrari route, is situated on the southwest face of the mountain. It was opened in 1975 by a group of Italian alpinists led by Casimiro Ferrari. It is considered a difficult climb, demanding good crampon and ice climbing technique. There are incomparable views of steep ice faces, penitentes, gigantic white walls and ridges like those of Huandoy Norte, Artesonraju and Huascaran Norte, similar to the finest of the Himalayan scenery. There are also at least six other alternative climbing routes, the second most popular being the Vasque-French route.

References

External links

Alpamayo on Summitpost
Expedition to Alpamayo - numerous photographs
 French Young Expedition to Alpamayo - photographs and good topo
Landscapes of the Soul - An Australian climber's stunning photos of climbers on the Ferrari Route, and his 1987 ascent/descent of the more difficult French Route.
Climbing Alpamayo 2007 ascent of the French Direct route, including many photographs
 French blog post on the ascent - photographs and ascension story

Mountains of Peru
Mountains of Ancash Region
Huascarán National Park
Five-thousanders of the Andes